Charles Terry Pledge (9 March 1887 – 31 March 1962) was a British architect. His work was part of the architecture event in the art competition at the 1948 Summer Olympics.

References

1887 births
1962 deaths
20th-century British architects
Olympic competitors in art competitions
People from Camberwell